Smiling at Grief is a studio album released by UK neo-progressive band Twelfth Night in 1981.

Details
Smiling at Grief comprised Twelfth Night's first recording with vocalist Geoff Mann. The album was recorded at Woodcray Manor Farm Studios, Berkshire.

The success of the Live at the Target LP had led to a publishing deal with Neptune Music. With their backing, the band decided to demo several new songs that were written with Geoff. The band were experimenting with shorter songs, consisting of one or a few ideas, instead of compositions of strings of ideas. The recordings were done in two batches at Woodcray Manor Farm Studios. In the time between those two, Rick Battersby decided to leave the band. For the remaining sessions, Clive Mitten doubled on keyboards.

After the recordings, the band realised they had an album's worth of music, so Smiling At Grief was released (as a cassette only, advertised at gigs and through the fan club).

Three of the songs, "East of Eden", "This City" and "The Creepshow" were re-recorded in 1982 for Fact and Fiction.

Track listing
All songs written by Twelfth Night except "Eleanor Rigby" by Lennon-McCartney.
 "East of Eden" (3:29) 
 "This City" (3:13) 
 "The Honeymoon Is Over" (2:35) 
 "Creepshow" (10:13) 
 "Puppets (Intro)" (1:25) 
 "Puppets" (2:50) 
 "Three Dancers" (2:54) 
 "Makes No Sense" (4:02) 
 "Für Helene Part II" (10:48)

Reissues

1997 reissue
Smiling at Grief was the first of the ongoing Twelfth Night reissue / archive programme, released on CD in 1997 on MSI Records with five bonus tracks recorded prior to the main sessions at the band's rehearsal venue, Burghfield Mill, Reading. This CD is now out-of-print.

  "Kindergarten" (3:05) 
 "Midnight" (0:51) 
 "Keep the Aspidistra Flying" (9:40) 
 "Convenient Blindness" (3:27) 
 "Makes No Sense" (5:10)

2009 reissue
Smiling at Grief is the first of the Twelfth Night "definitive releases" by Festival Music to be released in March 2009

Disc One – Smiling at Grief'
  "East of Eden" (3:29)
 "This City" (3:13)
 "The Honeymoon Is Over" (2:35)
 "Creepshow" (10:13)
 "Puppets (Intro)" (1:25)
 "Puppets" (2:50)
 "Three Dancers" (2:54)
 "Makes No Sense" (4:02)
 "Für Helene Part II" (10:48)
Tracks 1-9 are the original Smiling at Grief cassette album, recorded at Woodcray Manor Farm Studios, Berkshire, October–November 1981.
   "Kindergarten" (3:05)
 "Midnight" (poem) (0:51)
 "Keep the Aspidistra Flying" (9:40) [cf. George Orwell]
 "Convenient Blindness" (3:27)
 "Makes No Sense" (instrumental) (5:10)
Tracks 10-14 were bonus tracks first released on the 1997 MSI CD reissue. These were recorded at Burghfield Mill, Reading, in
September 1981.
  "Eleanor Rigby" (3:03)
Previously unreleased. Recorded at Woodcray Manor Farm Studios, Berkshire, November 1981.
  "This City" (alternative version) (3:19)
Previously unreleased. Recorded in Geoff's cellar, 59 Duchy St., Salford, September 1981.
 
Disc Two – SAG-LIVE'
  "Kindergarten" (3:05)
 "The Honeymoon Is Over" (2:50)
 "Eleanor Rigby" (3:38)
 "Makes No Sense" (5:20)
 "East to West" (9:39)
 "Three Dancers" (3:44)
 "Puppets" (3:50)
 "This City" (4:16)
 "Creepshow" (10:13)
 "East of Eden" (3:29)
 "Sequences" (20:15)
Tracks 1-11 recorded at The Target, Reading, 10 December 1981.
  "Convenient Blindness" (3:27)
Previously unreleased. Recorded at Burghfield Mill, Reading, September 1981.

2022 reissue - Smiling At Grief... Revisited
The album was remixed from the original master tapes in 2021-2022 and re-issued in three formats in March 2022.
The vinyl album contain the following tracks:

Side 1
 "East of Eden" (Steven Wilson mix)
 "This City" (Peter Jones mix)
 "The Honeymoon Is Over" (Karl Groom mix)
 "Creepshow" (Simon Godfrey mix)
 "Puppets (intro)" (Mark Spencer mix)
Side 2
 "Puppets" (Rob Reed redux)
 "Three Dancers" (Steven Wilson mix)
 "Makes No Sense" (2021 version by Tim Bowness and Brian Hulse)
 "Für Helene Part II" (Dean Baker mix)

The CD versions adds another seven tracks.

  "Puppets" (Steven Wilson mix)
 "The Honeymoon Is Over" (Andy Tillison mix)
 "Creepshow" (Paul Hodson mix)
 "Puppets" (alternative Rob Reed mix, featuring Stuart Nicholson and Lee Abraham)
 "Three Dancers" (Gareth Cole mix)
 "Makes No Sense" (2022 version by Mark Spencer)
 "East Of Eden" (extended) (Steven Wilson mix)

The downloads adds a further six alternative mixes

 "Für Helene II" - alternative mix - more keyboards (Dean Baker)
 "Puppets (intro)" (Rob Reed mix)
 "Puppets (intro)" (full length Mark Spencer mix)
 "Puppets" (first Rob Reed mix)
 "Creepshow" (Rumble Strips mix)
 "Makes No Sense" (Rumble Strips' stripped down mix)

Personnel
 Rick Battersby keyboards
 Brian Devoil drums and percussion 
 Geoff Mann vocals 
 Clive Mitten keyboards, bass 
 Andy Revell lead guitar

1982 albums
Twelfth Night (band) albums